The 1930–31 season was Chelsea Football Club's twenty-second competitive season. It was the club's first season back in the top-flight after a six-year absence.

Table

References

External links
 1930–31 season at stamford-bridge.com

1930-31
English football clubs 1930–31 season